Lake of the Woods 31B is a First Nations reserve on Lake of the Woods, northwestern Ontario. It is one of the reserves of the Anishnaabeg of Naongashiing.

External links
 Aboriginal Affairs and Northern Development Canada profile

Anishinaabe reserves in Ontario
Communities in Kenora District